

Occupation 
Rural women are found living in rural communities.  They are mostly involve in subsistence farming, petty trading and of- the-farm works. They work very hard but earn very little. These women suffer discrimination because they are not allowed to have equal ownership of land with their male counterparts. Most of what they earn is also extracted from them by their husbands or male family members. They also work on the family farm without payment. They also contribute to the economic upkeep of the family

Barriers to Achieving improved Economic life 

Rural women are faced with diverse barriers to improving their lives socially and economically. These barriers include lack of access to credit, lack of health care  and little or no education. They also face low skill jobs and unpaid labour

Efforts to improve Rural women labour 
Due to the uncountable and unpaid works that rural women do, research is on-going to measure the rural women employment. This is in order to  help design policies and programmes for rural women

References

Women and employment